Zulfiker Mahmud Mintu (born 9 December 1977 in Noakhali) is a Bangladeshi football coach and former Bangladesh national team player. He was the head coach of Saif Sporting Club in 2021. He is the current head coach of Sheikh Russel KC.

International career
Mintu played for the national team from 1998 to 2003. He was a member of 1999 South Asian Games gold medal-winning squad. He scored against both India and Maldives during 2000 Invitational Football Tournament in Maldives.

In March 2022, Mintu was appointed as the head coach of Sheikh Russel KC.

Personal life
Mintu was student of Dhaka University. Unlike many others who decided to marginalise education, Mintu diligently finished his Master's degree, while playing domestic football in the Dhaka League. After retiring due a serious injury in 2006, he went for further education taking the FIFA licence for coaching.

Statistics
As of 9 April 2022

Awards
 Sports Journalist and Writers Community Best Player: 1993
 Dhaka University Blue

References

Living people
People from Noakhali District
Bangladeshi football managers
Bangladeshi football coaches
1977 births
Abahani Limited (Dhaka) players
Brothers Union players
Muktijoddha Sangsad KC players
South Asian Games gold medalists for Bangladesh
Bangladeshi footballers
Bangladesh international footballers
Association football wingers
South Asian Games medalists in football
Bangladesh Football Premier League managers